Denise Vernac (3 June 1916 – 31 October 1984) was a French film actress. She appeared in 17 films between 1939 and 1966.

Additionally, Vernac was the secretary and companion of Erich von Stroheim, an actor, film director, film producer and screenwriter.

She died at age 68.

Selected filmography
 Immediate Call (1939)
 Cavalcade of Love (1939)
 Paris-New York (1940)
 The Mask of Diijon (1946)
 That's Not the Way to Die (1946)
 La Danse De Mort (1948)
 Le Signal Rouge (1949)
 Mandragore (1952)
 The Other Side of Paradise (1953)
 Madonna of the Sleeping Cars (1955)

Notes

External links

1916 births
1984 deaths
French film actresses
20th-century French actresses